"Twilight"  is a song written by Jeff Lynne for English rock band Electric Light Orchestra (ELO), originally released on their 1981 album Time. The lyrics tell of a man who falls asleep while in a twilight state, where he imagines everything in his life that is going to happen to him. They contribute to the album's overarching theme of time travel.  ELO writer Barry Delve says that "a cacophony of sound effects...transport us chaotically to the year 2095" to start the album and that the song "doesn't stop or pause for at least 2 minutes," making the song "one of the most exciting experiences ELO ever gave you."  Delve suggests that the piano break is influenced by Sergei Rachmaninoff.  Billboard said that it was "more intricate" than most ELO songs and that "a grand orchestral build coincides with swirling vocal harmonies for great effect." Record World said that it has "roller-coaster surges of angelic voices and awesome strings." Messenger-Press critic Steve Wosahla said that "Twilight" "indicates that ELO may never get away from Jeff Lynne's accessibly spacey pop pizzaz." Cincinnati Post critic Jerry Stein said that it "is a pounding tune but still has that soaring arrangement favored by the Beatles in so many of their uptempo songs.

It was the second single released from the album, peaking at number 30 on the UK Singles Chart and number 38 on the US Billboard Hot 100.  Delve explains the single's relatively poor performance despite his thinking that it is "A-grade ELO" saying that "with Time conceived and realized as a running narrative rather than a series of unconnected songs heard in isolation, many of the lyrics are quite esoteric with their talk of such things as time transporters and baffling references to the 1980s as if they were in the distant past which would have made less sense when heard out of context on top-40 radio stations."

Charts

In popular culture
It appeared, with authorisation and credit, in a 1982 Japanese advertisement for the Toyota Celica XX. It was also used as the finale song in the 2009-2010 Burton Snowboards film The B Movie, featuring most of the Burton team snowboarding on a "B" built out of snow.

Daicon IV

The song was used (without authorisation) as the theme music for the opening animation to the 1983 Daicon IV science fiction convention in Osaka. In 2005, as an homage to the Daicon IV animation, the song was used as the opening theme of the television series Densha Otoko, which features an otaku as the main character. As a similar homage, it has served as the opening song for the anime convention Otakon's AMV contest since 2008, with the exception of 2017.

References

Electric Light Orchestra songs
1981 singles
Song recordings produced by Jeff Lynne
Songs written by Jeff Lynne
1981 songs
Jet Records singles
Songs about time travel